Tomohiro Maruyama (born 7 March 1958) is a Japanese professional golfer.

Maruyama played on the Japan Golf Tour, winning three times.

Professional wins (6)

Japan Golf Tour wins (3)

Japan Golf Tour playoff record (0–1)

Japan Challenge Tour wins (1)
1985 Mito Green Open

Other wins (1)
1987 Acom Team Championship (with Nobuo Serizawa)

Japan PGA Senior Tour wins (1)
2009 Komatsu Open

Team appearances
Dunhill Cup (representing Japan): 1994

External links

Japanese male golfers
Japan Golf Tour golfers
Sportspeople from Kanagawa Prefecture
1958 births
Living people